The Western world is a term referring to different nations depending on the context.

Western World may also refer to:

 Greco-Roman world, regions and countries that were culturally influenced by the ancient Greeks and Romans
 Western Bloc, countries allied with the NATO during the Cold War

Ships
 Western World (British ship), a British sailing ship in the mid 1800s
 USS Western World (1856), a ship acquired by the Union Navy during the American Civil War

Other uses
 Western World (newspaper), former name of Warsaw Signal, United States newspaper published during the mid 1800s
 "The Western World", a 2008 music single by Pennywise 
 Western World Insurance Group, a United States insurance provider
 Robert's Western World, a honky tonk located in Nashville Tennessee, United States

See also
 Western Christianity, Latin Church of the Catholic Church and those denominations historically derived from it
 Westworld (disambiguation)